Ketika Sharma (born 24 December 1995) is an Indian film Actress, who predominantly appears in Tollywood. She made her debut to Tollywood through Puri Jagan's production banner movie Romantic and even before her debut release she bagged a movie with Naga Shourya's Lakshya.Ketika was born on December 24, 1995, in New Delhi, India. She is an actress, known for Romantic (2021), Lakshya (2021) and Ranga Ranga Vaibhavanga (2022).

Early life

Ketika Sharma started modeling after completing her studies. She introduced herself as a Social influencer. Ketika has gone viral over the social media because of her Dubmash video clips.

Career

Ketika Sharma made her debut in Telugu film Romantic released in 2021. Ketika's performance in the film received wide recognition, in addition to it a popular telugu film actor Prabhas said “Ketika looks lovable, I’m sure the audience will love her on-screen" after watching the trailer. 

In 2021 she appeared in a promo for Aha a telugu OTT platform,  opposite Allu Arjun

She also got a chance to act in a telugu film Lakshya.
Later in 2022, she acted in a telugu romantic drama film Ranga ranga vaibavamga. She gained appraisal from audience for her good performance and screen presence.

Filmography

Music videos

Singing

References

External links

 
 
 

1995 births
Living people
Telugu actresses
Actresses in Telugu cinema
21st-century Indian actresses
Indian film actresses